Ahai was a Jewish sage, one of the Savoraim.

Ahai may also refer to:

 Ahha or Ahai, 5th century bishop of Seleucia-Ctesiphon
 Ahai or Achai Gaon, 8th century Jewish scholar and rabbi
 Ahai Dam, Yunnan, China

Masculine given names